This is a list of the National Register of Historic Places listings in Indiana County, Pennsylvania.

This is intended to be a complete list of the properties and districts on the National Register of Historic Places in Indiana County, Pennsylvania, United States. The locations of National Register properties and districts for which the latitude and longitude coordinates are included below, may be seen in a map.

There are 24 properties and districts listed on the National Register in the county.

Current listings

|}

See also

 List of National Historic Landmarks in Pennsylvania
 National Register of Historic Places listings in Pennsylvania
 List of Pennsylvania state historical markers in Indiana County

References

 01
Indiana County
.
N